Nangnang or Naklang can have several meanings:
 Lelang Commandery
 The ancient Korean peninsular polity
 The commandery of the Han empire of China
 Nangnang-guyok, a district of Pyongyang, North Korea
 Nangnang, Bhutan, a town in Bumthang, Bhutan
 Na Klang (disambiguation), several places in Thailand